The 2015 Supersport World Championship was the seventeenth season of the Supersport World Championship—the nineteenth taking into account the two held under the name of Supersport World Series. Kenan Sofuoğlu claimed the title for the fourth time in the championship's history with one race to spare.

Race calendar and results

Entry list

All entries used Pirelli tyres.

Championship standings

Riders' championship

Manufacturers' championship

Notes

References

External links

Supersport World Championship seasons
Supersport World Championship
World